Four baronetcies have been created in the surname of Fowler, all of which are now extinct.

The Baronetcy of Fowler of Islington in the County of Middlessex was created in the Baronetage of England on 21 May 1628 for Thomas Fowler and was extinct on his death in 1656.

The Baronetcy of Fowler of Harnage Grange, in the County of Salop was created in the Baronetage of England on 1 November 1704 for William Fowler, the father of Sir Richard Fowler, who was Chancellor of the Duchy of Lancaster and Chancellor of the Exchequer during the reign of King Edward IV.

The Baronetcy of Fowler of Gastard House in the Parish of Corsham in the County of Wiltshire and of Bruce Grove in the Parish of Tottenham in the County of Middlesex was created in the Baronetage of the United Kingdom on 1 August 1885 for Robert Nicholas Fowler, a Member of Parliament

The Baronetcy of Fowler of Braemore, in the County of Ross was a title created in the Baronetage of the United Kingdom on 17 April 1890, for Sir John Fowler, civil engineer for the Metropolitan Railway and the Forth Railway Bridge.

Fowler of Islington (1628)

Created in the Baronetage of England.
 Sir Thomas Fowler, 1st and only Baronet (1586–1656) Extinct on his death

Fowler of Harnage Grange (1704)

Created in the Baronetage of England.
 Sir William Fowler, 1st Baronet (died 1717)
 Sir Richard Fowler, 2nd Baronet (died 1731)
 Sir William Fowler, 3rd Baronet (1718–1746)
 Sir William Fowler, 4th Baronet (died 1760)
 Sir Hans Fowler, 5th Baronet (died 1773)  Extinct on his death

Fowler of Gastard House (1885)

Created in the Baronetage of the United Kingdom.
 Sir Robert Nicholas Fowler, 1st Baronet (1828–1891)
 Sir Thomas Fowler, 2nd Baronet (1868–1902) Extinct on his death. Survived by seven of his ten sisters, including Jean Elizabeth and Rachel Elfreda.

Fowler of Braemore (1890)

Created in the Baronetage of the United Kingdom.
 Sir John Fowler, 1st Baronet (15 July 1817 – 20 November 1898)
 Sir John Arthur Fowler, 2nd Baronet (27 June 1854 – 27 March 1899), son of the 1st Baronet
 Sir John Edward Fowler, 3rd Baronet (21 April 1885 – 22 June 1915), son of the 2nd Baronet
 Reverend Sir Montague Fowler, 4th Baronet (12 November 1858 – 1 April 1933), 3rd son of the 1st Baronet. Extinct on his death as he had two daughters but no son.

References

 

Extinct baronetcies in the Baronetage of England
Extinct baronetcies in the Baronetage of Great Britain
Extinct baronetcies in the Baronetage of the United Kingdom